César Fernando María Tianko Basa (21 June 1915 – 12 December 1941) was a Filipino military pilot who fought in World War II. He was one of the pioneer fighter pilots of the Philippine Army Air Corps, the forerunner of the Philippine Air Force, and was the first Filipino fighter pilot casualty during World War II.

Early Years
César Basa was born on 21 June 1915 to Fernando Basa and Rosario Tianko of Isabela, Negros Occidental.  He finished his primary education in his home town, until their family moved to Manila where his parents enrolled him at the Ateneo de Manila University.  He took up Bachelor of Science Major in Chemistry, and graduating in the class of 1939.  In school he was known as a star player of their basketball team, and was a swimmer.  Upon graduating from the ADMU, he joined the Philippine Army Flying School in Zablan Airfield in Camp Murphy, and received his commission as 2nd Lieutenant upon graduation in 1940.

Death
Basa's fight took place at Batangas Field on the morning of 12 December 1941 when 27 Japanese bombers and 17 fighter escorts raided the base.

Several dogfights ensued as Villamor and his men fought desperately to prevent the pack of bombers and their fighter escorts from reaching and bombing Lipa Airfield. 

Lieutenant Basa, still airborne after a two hour air-reconnaissance mission, rushed to the scene and attempted to join the aerial engagement with only 15 minutes' worth of fuel left in his P-26. Enroute, he was intercepted by seven Japanese fighters and shot down. Although he was able to bring his aircraft back to Nichols Airfield and run for cover, he received a fatal head injury after one of the Japanese fighters swooped down to strafe his aircraft.  Lt. Victor Osias still attempted to rescue him, but Basa expired in his arms. This made him the first Filipino fighter-pilot casualty of war.

Captain Villamor and his pilots won the battle, with the only casualty being Basa. In recognition of his heroism, Lieutenant Basa was posthumously awarded the Silver Star.

Honors
Cesar Basa Air Base in Floridablanca, Pampanga, Philippines is named in his honor.

References

1915 births
1941 deaths
Filipino military personnel killed in World War II
Philippine Air Force personnel
Recipients of the Silver Star
Recipients of the Distinguished Service Cross (United States)
Filipino World War II pilots
Filipino military aviators
Ateneo de Manila University alumni
Philippine Army Air Corps
Filipino military personnel of World War II